Charles Louis Maisel (April 21, 1894 in Catonsville, Maryland – August 25, 1953 in Baltimore, Maryland), was a Major League Baseball player for the Federal League Baltimore Terrapins. He was a cousin to fellow Major League Baseball players Fritz Maisel, and George Maisel.

Maisel played one game in his career, on October 2, 1915.

Sources

Baseball Reference 

1894 births
1953 deaths
Major League Baseball catchers
Baltimore Terrapins players
People from Catonsville, Maryland